Josh Ottum (born March 1978) is an American musician, songwriter, and scholar.  Ottum recorded Like The Season between October 2005 and June 2006 it was released in the fall of 2006 in Europe by Tapete Records, along with an EP, Who  Left The Lights On?.  Ottum was part of the 2006 Reeperbahn Festival in Hamburg, Germany, and toured extensively through Europe in November 2006 and May 2007. Mill Pond Records released the It's Alright EP in May 2007. Ottum was part the Sit Down and Sing tour with Rosie Thomas and Nicolai Dunger in April 2008. Like The Season came out in the United States on October 20, 2009 on Cheap Lullaby Records. The Mellow Out EP was released by Tapete Records in May 2011 followed by Ottum's second full-length Watch TV, released on July 8, 2011.

Ottum's third album, recorded in part with orchestral instrumentation, was funded through Kickstarter in 2012.

Discography
EPs
 Who Left The Lights On? (Europe)- November 7, 2006
 It's Alright (U.S.)- May 15, 2007
 Mellow Out 2011

LPs
 Like The Season (Europe) - November 15, 2006
 Like The Season (U.S.) - October 20, 2009
 Watch TV 2011
 Smart/dumb  - 2012

References

External links

 Official site
  Josh Ottum's Myspace Page
 Josh Ottum's page at Tapete Records

1978 births
Living people
American indie rock musicians
American multi-instrumentalists
American male songwriters
Tapete Records artists